Emamzadeh Bazm (also Romanized as Emāmzādeh Bazm and Emāmzādehbazm) is a village in Sarvestan Rural District, in the Central District of Bavanat County, Fars Province, Iran. At the 2006 census, its population was 68, in 20 families.

References 

Populated places in Bavanat County